Thus Spoke Rohan Kishibe, known in Japan as , is a series of manga one-shots created by Hirohiko Araki. It is a spin-off from Diamond Is Unbreakable, the fourth part of Araki's JoJo's Bizarre Adventure series, and features the character Rohan Kishibe, a manga artist who travels around the world to get inspiration from people's lives. The English title of the series is a reference to the book Thus Spoke Zarathustra by Friedrich Nietzsche.

The series is published by Shueisha, starting with the one-shot "Episode 16: At a Confessional" in 1997 in their Weekly Shōnen Jump; new episodes have since appeared in their Jump Square, Shōnen Jump+, Bessatsu Margaret, JoJo Magazine and Ultra Jump magazines. The series was originally meant to be completely original, but it was changed as Araki found it too tempting to use Rohan. A collected volume was released in 2013, and a second volume was released in 2018. The first volume was the 68th best-selling manga volume of 2014 in Japan and was well received by critics. Spin-off short stories by several writers were published in the Appendix Booklet of Ultra Jump magazine from 2017 to 2021. In 2018, they were compiled into two volumes: Rohan Kishibe Does Not Shout and Rohan Kishibe Does Not Frolic. Another volume, Rohan Kishibe Does Not Fall, was released in 2022. Each volume included an additional original story. Original video animation (OVA) adaptations were released by David Production from 2017 to 2020. A live-action adaptation premiered on NHK General TV in December 2020.

Synopsis
The series follows the character Rohan Kishibe, a famous manga artist who wants to give his works more realism, and therefore travels around the world to draw inspiration from people's lives. He does this by using his Stand ability – a manifestation of his inner strength, named "Heaven's Door", which he uses to read and write in a person, allowing him to learn everything about them and alter their memories and behaviors.

Production and publication

Thus Spoke Rohan Kishibe is created by Hirohiko Araki in an episodic format. It began with "Episode 16: At a Confessional", which was published by Shueisha on July 7, 1997, in Weekly Shōnen Jump #30/1997. Although he had originally been asked to write a wholly original story, unrelated to JoJo's Bizarre Adventure, he found it too tempting to use his Diamond Is Unbreakable character Rohan Kishibe to resist. For later episodes, the series switched back and forth between different Shueisha publications, with new episodes appearing in Weekly Shōnen Jump, Jump Square, Shōnen Jump+, Bessatsu Margaret, JoJo Magazine and Ultra Jump. "Mochizuki Family Moon Viewing", the episode from the web magazine Shōnen Jump+, was part of the publication's launch line-up and was made available to read for free. 

In 2009, Araki's was one of five artists featured in the Louvre's Le Louvre invite la bande dessinée ("The Louvre Invites Comic-Strip Art") exhibition for his artwork of JoJo's Bizarre Adventure. To commemorate this honor, he wrote , a 123-page full color story starring Rohan Kishibe visiting the Louvre and discovering a cursed painting tied to his family. The following year it was published in France and ran in Ultra Jump, and in February 2012 was translated and released in North America by NBM Publishing.

From September 17 to October 6, 2011, the Gucci store in Shinjuku hosted the Gucci x Hirohiko Araki x Spur "Rohan Kishibe Goes to Gucci" Exhibition, a collaboration between the luxury Italian clothing brand, Araki, and the Japanese fashion magazine Spur. The exhibit celebrated the 90th anniversary of Gucci and featured a life-size figure of Rohan Kishibe, as well as numerous illustrations by Araki that included actual pieces of the brand's own 2011–2012 fall/winter collection and his own original fashion designs.
The October 2011 issue of the Japanese fashion magazine Spur featured another one-shot manga titled , in which Rohan goes to a Gucci factory to discover the secret behind a magical handbag.

A collected volume of one-shots by Araki, titled Under Execution Under Jailbreak, was released in 1999 in Japan, containing "At a Confessional" along with three other stories. A collected Thus Spoke Rohan Kishibe volume was later released in Japan on November 19, 2013, containing the first four episodes, along with "Rohan Kishibe Goes to Gucci". A second volume containing the next four episodes was released in Japan on July 19, 2018. In February 2022, Viz Media announced they licensed the series for English publication under the title Thus Spoke Rohan Kishibe, with the first volume released on September 27, 2022. The first volume was also published by Star Comics in Italy on January 8, 2015, as Così parlò Rohan Kishibe, and by Tonkam in France in April 2016 as Rohan Kishibe.

Episodes

Volumes

Original video animation
An original video animation (OVA) adaptation of "Episode 5: Millionaire Village" was produced by the animation studio David Production, with direction by Toshiyuki Kato, direction assistance by Yasufumi Soejima, character design by Shun'ichi Ishimoto, and Stand design by Kenta Mimuro. The opening theme, "Kishibe Rohan wa Ugokanai no Tema", is performed by Yuugo Kanno, while the ending theme, "Finding the Truth", is performed by Coda. The OVA was distributed on DVD in 2017 to people who had purchased all thirteen Japanese DVD or Blu-ray volumes of the 2016 television anime series JoJo's Bizarre Adventure: Diamond Is Unbreakable before July 31, 2017. Kato made use of different coloring compared to the Diamond Is Unbreakable anime, to capture the feeling of horror in the manga, and directed the opening sequence to simultaneously give off a feeling of nostalgia and unease, referencing television shows like The Twilight Zone (1959) and Twin Peaks (1990). A second OVA episode by the same studio and staff, adapting "Episode 2: Mutsu-kabe Hill", was released on DVD on July 19, 2018, in a bundle with pre-orders of the limited edition of the second manga volume. A single containing the opening and ending themes was released on the same day as the second OVA episode. Two new OVA episodes, adapting "Episode 16: At a Confessional" and "Episode 9: The Run", were screened theatrically in nine cities in Japan starting on December 8, 2019, and were released on DVD and Blu-Ray on March 25, 2020.

At the Netflix Anime Festival in late October 2020, the company acquired streaming rights to the OVAs for a 2021 release. In January 2021, Netflix announced that it would premiere on February 18.

Voice cast

Episodes

Live action
NHK announced on October 13, 2020, that it is producing a three-episode live-action mini-series adaptation of Thus Spoke Rohan Kishibe. The adaptation of two stories from the manga (Millionaire Village and D.N.A) and one story from the short story collection (Kushagara) aired on NHK General TV and NHK BS4K on December 28, 29, and 30 respectively, 10 pm to 10:49 pm in Japan. On August 15, 2021, NHK announced that the series will have three new episodes that will air in December 2021. They adopted two stories from the Rohan Kishibe manga (The Run and Mutsu-kabe Hill) and the Cheap Trick story arc from Diamond Is Unbreakable (From Behind). On August 20, 2022, NHK announced that new episodes will air in December 2022. They adapted one story from the Rohan Kishibe manga (Hot Summer Martha) and the Janken Boy Is Coming! story arc from Diamond Is Unbreakable (Rock-Paper-Scissors Boy). On January 4, 2023, it was announced that the series is getting a live-action movie on May 26, 2023. The film will be titled Rohan at the Louvre, based on the manga story of the same name. The cast and staff from the series will return for the movie.

Main cast

Other cast members

Episodes

Staff 

Original: Hirohiko Araki, Kitaguni Ballad (Novel, Kushagara)
 Screenwriter: Yasuko Kobayashi
 Music: Naruyoshi Kikuchi
 Directing: Kazutaka Watanabe
 Recording: Shuhei Yamamoto
 Lighting: Koji Toriuchi
 Recording: Sou Takagi
 Arts: Sayaka Isogai
 Editor: Sho Suzuki
 Supervisor: Isao Tsuge
 Executive Producers: Takayasu Suzuki, Keisuke Tsuchihashi, Daisuke Hiraga
 Production: NHK Enterprises
 Production, Writing: NHK, PICS

Reception
The first collected volume debuted to an estimated 278,268 copies sold for its first week on sale in Japan, ranking as third in the weekly Japanese top-50 comics charts, after Detective Conan volume 81 and Terra Formars volume 7. It charted for four consecutive weeks, selling a total of 422,994 copies. By May 2014, it had sold 526,719 copies, and by November, sales had reached 553,380, making it the 68th best selling manga volume in Japan of 2014. The second volume's standard and limited editions debuted to 132,283 and 20,128 copies sold, respectively, ranking as fourth and thirty-sixth in the weekly Japanese comic charts.

The series was well received by critics. Maria Antonietta Idotta of MangaForever said that the series managed to express full range of drama, depth and complexity typical of Araki's long-form works despite its one-shot format, and called the artwork "sublime". Takato of Manga-News also found it to capture the essence of Araki's long-form JoJo's Bizarre Adventure while working as a newcomer-friendly stand-alone work, and enjoyed how the shorter format caused a stronger focus on the atmosphere and world, making it feel like more than just a spin-off. Erkael, also writing for Manga-News, thought the art and writing would both satisfy existing fans and attract new ones, and called it "a pleasure to read" despite the change in tone compared to JoJo's Bizarre Adventure, with more elements of horror and high tension.

Notes

References

External links
 "Mochizuki Family Moon Viewing: Thus Spoke Rohan Kishibe Episode 4" can be read for free in the browser at Shōnen Jump+ 
 Official website for the original video animation, archived 
Thus Spoke Rohan Kishibe on Netflix
Thus Spoke Rohan Kishibe Exhibit in Tokyo, May 2018

Comics spin-offs
JoJo's Bizarre Adventure
Shueisha manga
Shōnen manga
Seinen manga
Shōjo manga
One-shot manga
OVAs based on manga
Netflix original anime
Viz Media manga